Apache Nitrogen Products (formerly Apache Powder Company) began in 1920 as an American manufacturer of nitroglycerin-based explosives (dynamite) for the mining industry and other regional users of dynamite. It occupies a historic location in Cochise County, Arizona, and is one of the county's largest employers. The company changed its name to Apache Nitrogen Products in 1990.

The company is located on Apache Powder Road, in an unincorporated area just outside of St. David, Arizona. The plant's location, and the Southern Pacific Railroad stop there, were referred to as Curtiss, Arizona in the 1920s.

History
The company was incorporated in New Jersey in May, 1920, with Articles of incorporation filed with the Arizona Corporation Commission on June 11, 1920. Charles E. Mills, President, Valley Bank, promoted establishment of the company following WWI, enlisting support of regional mining companies. Mills banded together a group of assistants with necessary expertise to formulate planning. Following independent review, decision was made to proceed. This was a cooperative venture by several large mines located throughout the Southwestern United States and Northwestern Mexico. Shares of the company were distributed with 65% held by the mining companies and 35% by Mills and associates. Charles Mills served as president and managing director of the company until his death in January, 1929. Charles E. Mills was a Harvard-educated mining engineer who moved to Bisbee, Arizona in 1888 where he worked for the Copper Queen Mine. Mills found great success in Arizona and was later the president of Arizona's Valley Bank. The dry climate of southern Arizona "was considered beneficial to the production of high grade powder". Another benefit of the location was hilly terrain that provided natural protection from explosion for the buildings used in production. The plant was also well located to serve regional consumers using existing railroads.

Construction of the plant began in March, 1920, finishing in April, 1922. The first shipment of dynamite occurred in April, 1922. Production was running at one million pounds of powder per month in 1923. The company was the only producer of these explosives in the Southwestern United States, producing 41 million pounds in 1956. It supplied explosives to mines in Arizona, New Mexico, northern Mexico, and the surrounding areas. Employment was in the hundreds, even through the great depression. The plant eventually became the largest single location for the production of dynamite in the country.

In response to changes in mining technology, the product line expanded to include blasting agents based on ammonium nitrate and nitric acid in the 1940s. Ammonium nitrate was produced from anhydrous ammonia and air (the DuPont process) beginning in the 1950s. The original nitroglycerine-based products were phased-out by 1983. In the 1990s the company was also producing detonating cord and ammonium nitrate solution for agricultural fertilizer. Fertilizer was being sold to alfalfa, asparagus, cotton, citrus, lettuce, pecan, and wheat farmers in Arizona, California, New Mexico, and Mexico. Three quarters of sales were to the mining industry, however. One of the original buildings at the site, a red brick structure known as the Powderhouse (built ), was still in use as of 2012. It contains boilers that produce steam which turn turbines to make the plant's electricity.

As of the mid-1980s, the company was owned jointly by Phelps Dodge, Magma Copper, Cyprus Copper, Southwest Energy, and the heirs of Charles Mills.

Railroad
The plant operated a narrow-gauge railroad to move material around the complex. It was a three-foot gauge railway. Because of the risk of sparks causing an explosion in a dynamite manufacturing plant, freight was initially pulled by mules. The mules were later replaced with fireless locomotives manufactured by H.K. Porter Company. Apache Powder purchased seven of these locomotives, which could run for an hour on  steam after being charged at a boiler located a safe distance away from the working areas of the complex.

Present location of six of the Porter 0-4-0 locomotives:

Incidents

In 1923, an explosion killed four workers and injured another. It was the first disaster since the plant opened. Five small buildings and a warehouse were destroyed.

In 1927,  of nitroglycerine exploded at the place destroying several buildings. The explosion was heard for miles but caused no injuries. An operator noticed a problem and initiated a warning system; he and other workers were able to run to safety before the explosion.

In 2014, 52,000 lb of anhydrous ammonia slammed into multiple ANPI employees and one contractor. This incident would lead to them being fined $1,500,000 in 2018 by the EPA.

Superfund site

The United States Environmental Protection Agency (EPA) has designated the site as a Superfund site due to pollution of hazardous material contaminations requiring a long-term response to clean up. In addition, soil is contaminated with arsenic, antimony, barium, beryllium, chromium, lead, manganese, nitrate, 2,4-DNT, 2,6-DNT, lead, vanadium pentoxide, paraffins, and TNT from the commercial production of chemicals.

The EPA finalized a treatment plan in 1994 which called for contaminated water to be pumped out and evaporated, as well as some treatment via wetlands and aquifer recharge. Contaminated soils were either contained on-site and capped or excavated and removed to off-site disposal. All construction work was completed in 2008 and the area was classified as "Ready for Reuse and Redevelopment" in 2010.

Historic district

Eight individual lots were sold to company officials, who had houses built (by unknown contractors). After a disagreement, the company purchased the lots back and then rented them to the employees at subsidized rates. Apache also build an "evacuation hospital" at 209 West 6th St. The company owned the properties for many decades, eventually selling them in the 1970s and 80s. A  parcel on the north side of the street was used as a park and legally transferred in the 1960s by the company to the City of Benson. The eight houses, the hospital building, and the park were designated as the Apache Powder Historic Residential District and listed on the National Register of Historic Places in 1994.

References

External links
Porter locomotive on display

American companies established in 1920
Companies based in Arizona
1920 establishments in Arizona
Explosives manufacturers